Kathryn "Katie" Abbott (born 8 December 1986) is a Canadian sailor. She competed in the 2008 Summer Olympics.

References

1986 births
Living people
Sailors at the 2008 Summer Olympics – Yngling
Canadian female sailors (sport)
Olympic sailors of Canada
Sportspeople from Sarnia